Vienne (Poitevin-Saintongeais: Viéne) is a landlocked department in the French region of Nouvelle-Aquitaine. It takes its name from the river Vienne. It had a population of 438,435 in 2019.

History 
Established on March 4, 1790, during the French Revolution, Vienne is one of the original 83 departments. It was created from parts of the former provinces of Poitou, Touraine, and Berry, the latter being a part of the Duchy of Aquitaine until the 15th century.

The original Acadians, who settled in and around what is now Nova Scotia, left Vienne for North America after 1604. Kennedy (2014) argues that the emigrants carried to Canada their customs and social structure. They were frontier peoples, who dispersed their settlements based on kinship. They optimized use of farmland and emphasized trading for a profit.  They were hierarchical and politically active.

Geography

Part of the region Nouvelle-Aquitaine, it borders Maine-et-Loire to the northwest, Indre-et-Loire to the north, Indre to the east, Haute-Vienne to the southeast, Charente to the south and Deux-Sèvres to the west. It is crossed by the river Vienne, a tributary of the Loire.

Principal towns

The most populous commune is Poitiers, the prefecture. As of 2019, there are 6 communes with more than 7,000 inhabitants:

Demographics 
Population development since 1801:

Politics 
Édith Cresson, France's first woman prime minister from 1991 to 1992, was a deputy (MP) for the department. The president of the Departmental Council is Alain Pichon, elected in 2020.

Vienne has three arrondissements: Poitiers, the prefecture, and the subprefectures Châtellerault and Montmorillon.

Current National Assembly Representatives

Religion 
The capital, Poitiers, is the see of the Roman Catholic Archdiocese of Poitiers, which pastorally serves the department.

Tourism and sights 
The most famous tourist sites include the Futuroscope theme park, Poitiers (city of Art and History), the Abbey Church of Saint-Savin-sur-Gartempe, a UNESCO world heritage site, the animal parks of Monkey's Valley in Romagne and the Crocodile Planet in Civaux.

Economy 
Goat cheese making is an important industry of Vienne.

International relations 

Vienne has a partnership relationship with:

Notable people 
 
 
Benoît-François Bernier (1720–1799), New France army officer, served as financial commissary of wars

Gallery

See also 
Communes of the Vienne department
Cantons of the Vienne department
Arrondissements of the Vienne department
Anjou wine

References

External links 
Departmental Council website  
Prefecture website 
Vienne Tourism Agency

 
1790 establishments in France
Departments of Nouvelle-Aquitaine
States and territories established in 1790